The electric yellow cichlid is a popular freshwater aquarium fish. It is a naturally occurring variant of Labidochromis caeruleus  endemic to the central western coastal region of Nkhata Bay in Lake Malawi in East Africa. It is the most popular African cichlid amongst aquarium hobbyists. These fish are mouthbrooders; the female lays her eggs on the surface of rocks and then scoops them into her mouth where they brood for 18 days before being released.

The electric yellow cichlid is set apart from other African cichlids by its striking electric yellow coloration.  Mature specimens flaunt contrasting weird black stripes and vertical bars to provide additional visual interest.
The electric yellow African cichlid is also known colloquially as the yellow lab or electric yellow lab. Considered a newer species and referred to commercially as Labidochromis tanganicae, this cichlid lives in the waters of Lake Malawi between the islands of Charo and Mbowe. First displayed at Burundi in the early 1980s and exported from there, the electric yellow was mistakenly believed to come from Lake Tanganyika.

A peaceful and shy cichlid compared to other African cichlids, the electric yellow still displays distinct social and territorial behaviors. The electric yellow will act aggressively towards fish of similar body shape and color perceived to be competition for food and mates. The aquarium should include a sandy bottom, caves, and rocks.

In the aquarium 

 Size: 5+ Inches
 Minimum tank requirements are dependent on a few factors, seeing as Yellow Labs are far more peaceful than one would imagine.
 Breeding: 30 gallon minimum for 1 male and 5 females
 community: 55 gallons
 species only: 1-4 in a 10 gallon; 5-7 in a 20-gallon, 8-10 in a 30-gallon, and 11-15 in a 45.
 These fish prefer open swimming areas as well as many caves.
 The aquarium would optimally include a sandy bottom, robust plants, caves, and rocks.
 The electric yellow cichlid needs both meaty foods and greens such as brine shrimp, bloodworms, and quality flake or pellet food containing vegetable matter. Malawi bloat can occur if they are fed too much protein, and they should be fed mostly vegetable matter.  They are compatible with most zebra cichlids, yellow tail acei cichlids, rusty cichlids and other African cichlids with a more peaceful less aggressive nature.
 The water needs to be semi-hard so the DH value should range from 18 to 20. The ideal PH value should be between 7 and 8. -Tasin

See also 
Labidochromis caeruleus
Mbuna
List of freshwater aquarium fish species

References 

electric yellow cichlid
Fish of Lake Malawi